The University of Transkei was a university in Umtata in the former bantustan of Transkei in South Africa. It was founded in 1976 as a branch of the University of Fort Hare and after the Transkei gained nominal independence in 1977, it became the University of Transkei. On 1 July 2005, the university merged with Border Technikon and Eastern Cape Technikon to become the Walter Sisulu University, named after anti-apartheid activist Walter Sisulu.

Well-known people associated with the university include Wiseman Nkuhlu, economic adviser to former President Thabo Mbeki. Cartoonist Jonathan Shapiro was made an Honorary Doctor of Literature by the University in 2004. Author R.L. Peteni became Chancellor in 1989.

External links 
 University of Transkei Faculty of Medicine and Health Sciences
 Latest Articles On University Of Transkei

Educational institutions established in 1977
Defunct universities and colleges in South Africa
Educational institutions disestablished in 2005
1977 establishments in South Africa
Transkei